Patrik Laine (born 19 April 1998) is a Finnish professional ice hockey winger who currently plays for the  Columbus Blue Jackets of the National Hockey League. Laine formerly played in his native Finland with Tappara in the Finnish Liiga before he was taken with the second overall pick in the 2016 NHL Entry Draft by the Winnipeg Jets.

Early life
Laine began playing hockey at four years old and he initially played every position. His primary position was goaltender which was his favorite position and his best at the time. Urged by his father, Laine permanently switched to forward when he was 12. Laine left school at age 16 to focus full-time on hockey.

Playing career

Tappara
Laine started to play hockey in Ilves at age four, but soon changed to local competitor Tappara. Laine made his Liiga debut at age 16 with Tappara during the 2014–15 season, logging six games and scoring one point. However, he spent most of that season on loan with LeKi of Mestis.

Laine began the 2015–16 season with Tappara, and over a span of 46 games with the club scored 17 goals and 16 assists for a total of 33 points.

Prior to the start of his NHL draft season, Laine was ranked in numerous hockey publications as the fourth-best prospect in the 2016 NHL Entry Draft. Due to strong play with Tappara early in the season and an impressive showing at the 2015 IIHF World U18 Championships where he scored eight goals in seven games, Laine's ranking on most draft lists rose from the previous season, when he had been considered a mid-first-round prospect.

After a dominant performance at the 2016 World Junior Ice Hockey Championships where he won a gold medal, was the third-leading scorer with 7 goals, 6 assist and 13 points in 7 games, and was named to the tournament all-star team, Laine began to receive greater attention from scouts and casual observers. By January 2016, Laine had moved up the ranking on most lists to second overall. McKeen's Hockey notably ranked Laine first overall on its January 2016 list. According to hockey analyst Bob McKenzie's mid-season draft report, Laine had become the "clear consensus No. 2 choice" over fellow Finnish prospect Jesse Puljujärvi. This was due to what scouts described as a "'dynamic' element", with one scout elaborating, "Laine maybe is more of a pure goal scorer, a game-breaker with a little higher offensive ceiling."

By February 2016, Laine was considered by some scouts, such as those from McKeen's and those represented in Bob McKenzie's report, to be a potential challenger for first overall at the 2016 NHL Draft, challenging the previous consensus choice, top-ranked prospect Auston Matthews. When asked by McKenzie if Matthews was still the favorite to be selected first overall in the June 2016 draft, several scouts expressed they "had to think long and hard about it . . . Laine is right there". One scout justified that "in the end, we favoured the centre over the winger but I don’t think it’s a reach at all to see Laine going first overall. A lot of our European scouts who see these guys think Laine is better".

In April 2016, McKenzie reported Laine had further closed the gap between himself and Matthews, with two of the ten NHL scouts surveyed by McKenzie reporting they would choose Laine ahead of Matthews. The other scouts in McKenzie's April report, meanwhile, stated they needed to think "long and hard about their decision" to rank Matthews ahead of Laine. The National Post, meanwhile, published an article with a headline proclaiming Laine to be the "NHL draft's true No. 1".

Laine's 2015–16 regular season campaign with Tappara ended in March 2016 with his team finishing third overall in the Liiga standings and thus qualifying for the subsequent post-season. Laine played a pivotal role in the semifinal series against second-ranked Kärpät, scoring six goals in the seven-game series, including three last-minute goals to tie Games 4, 5, and 6; two of those goals occurred in the final minute of the third period of their respective games, with Laine's Game 6 goal being scored at 19:59 of the third period with one second remaining on the clock. With his last-second tying goal in Game 6, his eighth of the playoffs, Laine broke Liiga's previous goal-scoring record of seven goals in a single rookie playoff campaign. Laine and Tappara consequently defeated Kärpät and advanced to the 2016 Liiga Finals. Trailing 2–1 in the Liiga Finals series against HIFK, Tappara coach Jussi Tapola moved Laine to the team's first line with Jani Lajunen and leading scorer Kristian Kuusela for Game 4, where Laine recorded a goal and two assists to lead his team to a 2–2 series tie. This was Laine's first ever game on Tappara's top line—for the first part of the 2015–16 campaign he had played with Jere Karjalainen, Veli-Matti Savinainen and Stephen Dixon, while for the majority of the season, he played on the team's second line with Arttu Ilomäki and Jukka Peltola. For the first 15 games of the playoffs, his line featured Jan-Mikael Järvinen at centre with Peltola on right wing. Laine scored once more in the series-clinching match, as Tappara defeated HIFK in six games to win the 2016 Liiga championship title. He was consequently awarded the Jari Kurri Trophy as Liiga's 2016 playoff MVP, finishing the post-season with 10 goals and 5 assists for 15 points in 18 games.

Winnipeg Jets

Laine was selected with the second overall pick in the 2016 NHL Entry Draft by the Winnipeg Jets. On 3 July 2016, he agreed to a three-year, entry-level contract with Winnipeg, signalling the start to his North American career. On 13 October 2016, Laine made his debut in the NHL when he played in the Jets' season-opening game in which Laine got a goal and an assist. On 19 October 2016, Laine scored his first hat-trick in a 5–4 win against the Toronto Maple Leafs, becoming, at 18 years, 183 days old, the youngest player born outside North America to score at least twice in one game in NHL history. This record was bested by fellow Finn Jesperi Kotkaniemi, who, at 18 years, 118 days old, scored twice against the Washington Capitals on 1 November 2018. On 8 November 2016, Laine got his second NHL hat-trick. On 7 January 2017, Buffalo Sabres defenceman Jake McCabe hit Laine while he was receiving a pass. As a result, Laine suffered a concussion and missed eight games. Despite his injury, Laine was selected to participate in the 2017 NHL All-Star Game. On 14 February 2017, Laine scored his third NHL hat trick. On 21 February 2017, Laine broke the Winnipeg Jets / Atlanta Thrashers franchise record for the most goals in a single season by a rookie, previously held by Ilya Kovalchuk with 29 goals. By the end of the year, Laine had 36 goals and 28 assists for 64 points, the second-highest in franchise history for a rookie, next to Dany Heatley who had 67 points (26 goals, 41 assists) as a rookie in 2001–02, and the highest since relocation to Winnipeg.

In Laine's second season with Winnipeg, on 25 February 2018, Laine scored his 30th and 31st goals of the year, making him the seventh teenager in the history of NHL to score consecutive 30-goal seasons. On 6 March 2018, Laine scored his fourth NHL hat-trick in a 3–0 win over the New York Rangers, becoming the third teenager in the history of the NHL to record four three-goal games before their 20th birthday. On 15 March 2018, in a game against the Chicago Blackhawks, Laine extended his point streak to 14 games, which set a new NHL record for the longest point streak by a teenager in NHL history. His streak ended at 15 games on 20 March 2018 after he failed to collect a point in a game against the Los Angeles Kings. At the conclusion of the 2017–18 regular season, Laine placed second for most goals scored in the regular season with 44, behind Alexander Ovechkin's 49. Despite losing the NHL top goal scorer award, Laine became the first teenager in 30 years to score a total of 80 goals, surpassing Sidney Crosby's 75. Laine recorded his first playoff goal in Game 1 against the Minnesota Wild to help the Jets to their first playoff win in franchise history, 3–2. He became the youngest player in Jets history, as well as the youngest Finnish player in the NHL, to score a playoff goal at 19 years 357 days.

After struggling to score at the beginning of the 2018–19 season, putting up only five points in 12 games, Laine recorded his fifth career hat-trick during the 2018 NHL Global Series in his home country, Finland. His hat trick helped the Jets win 4–2 over the Florida Panthers. On 19 November 2018, Laine recorded his sixth hat trick, against the Vancouver Canucks in a 6–3 win. On 24 November 2018, Laine recorded five goals in an 8–4 win over the St. Louis Blues, becoming the first person since Johan Franzén in February 2011 to accomplish that feat, and 45th player to do it. Laine had only five shots in the game, making him the sixth player in NHL history to score five goals on five shots and the first since Wayne Gretzky in 1984. A few days later on 29 November, Laine scored his 100th goal, becoming the fourth-youngest player in NHL history to score 100 regular season goals.

Without contract and as a restricted free agent, Patrik Laine moved to Switzerland to train with SC Bern. However, on 27 September 2019, Laine signed a two-year, $13.5 million contract extension with the Jets. The 2019–20 season, which was shortened by the COVID-19 pandemic, was a resurgent one for Laine, who scored 63 points in 68 games for a career high 0.93 points per game. Despite this improvement, however, his wrist was injured in Game 1 of the play-in round of the 2020 Stanley Cup playoffs against the Calgary Flames, and did not return as the Jets were eliminated in four games.

Columbus Blue Jackets
Although Laine had a stronger season in 2019–20 than the one prior, rumors circulated during the off-season that the Jets were interested in trading him from the team, including one from Laine's own agent; Laine dismissed any concern about these rumors in an interview in January 2021. Laine played in the season-opening game for the Jets against the Calgary Flames on 14 January 2021, scoring two goals and an assist, including the overtime-winning goal, in a 4–3 Jets win; however, he was sidelined after suffering an injury at practice on 17 January. On 23 January, before he returned from injury, he was traded along with Jack Roslovic to the Columbus Blue Jackets in exchange for Pierre-Luc Dubois and a 2022 third-round pick. On 9 February, Laine's off-ice issues surfaced again when after multiple defensive lapses, Laine got into a verbal altercation with an assistant coach and was benched for the remainder of the game. During his first season at Columbus he scored 10 goals and 11 assists in 45 games.

On 27 July 2021, Laine accepted his qualifying offer as a restricted free agent and signed a one-year, $7.5 million contract extension with the Blue Jackets.

On 22 July 2022, Laine signed a four-year, $34.8 million contract extension with the Blue Jackets.

International play

In April 2015, Laine participated at the 2015 IIHF World U18 Championships for Finland. Through seven games in the tournament, Laine scored 8 goals and 3 assists for 11 points to help lead his team to the gold medal match against the United States and an eventual silver medal finish. He was subsequently named to the 2015 U18 tournament All-Star Team.

Laine subsequently played for Finland at the 2016 World Junior Championships, where they won gold on 5 January 2016. Due to his impressive play throughout the tournament with linemates Jesse Puljujärvi and Sebastian Aho, Laine was named to the tournament All-Star Team. During the tournament, Laine scored 7 goals and 6 assists for 13 points in 7 games.

Following his 2016 Liiga championship, Laine was named to the Finland roster at the 2016 IIHF World Championship, becoming the youngest Finnish player to ever play at the tournament. He debuted against Belarus, scoring two goals and one assist to become the youngest player in the tournament's history to score three points in a game. He followed this with a second consecutive two-goal, one-assist, three-point game against Germany, recording six points in two games to become the highest-scoring draft-age player in the tournament's history; the previous record was held by Jaromír Jágr, who at the same age scored three goals and two assists for five points in ten games at the 1990 Men's World Ice Hockey Championships in Switzerland. In Finland's final round robin game against Canada, Laine did not score but was considered by analyst Ray Ferraro among others to have had his best game of the tournament. Laine and Finland subsequently reached the gold medal game, a rematch against Canada, where they were defeated 2–0. Laine finished the tournament with 7 goals and 5 assists for 12 points in 10 games and led the tournament in goals scored. He achieved the second-highest point total by a U-19 player at a World Championship tournament, behind only Sidney Crosby's tournament total of 16 points at the 2006 IIHF World Championship. At the conclusion of the 2016 IIHF World Championship, Laine was named the tournament's Most Valuable Player, was named to the tournament All-Star team, and received the IIHF Directorate Award for the tournament's best forward.

Personal life
Laine's favourite NHL team growing up was the Washington Capitals, particularly liking Alexander Ovechkin. In his spare time, Laine likes to play video games, with Fortnite being a personal favorite.

The Players' Tribune published an article under Laine's byline titled "Winnipeg is Good" on 6 February 2018, but Laine denied any involvement aside from being interviewed.

Career statistics

Regular season and playoffs

International

Awards and honours

References

External links
 

1998 births
Living people
Columbus Blue Jackets players
Finnish ice hockey right wingers
National Hockey League All-Stars
National Hockey League first-round draft picks
Ice hockey people from Tampere
Tappara players
Winnipeg Jets draft picks
Winnipeg Jets players